Chamblay is a commune in the Jura department in Bourgogne-Franche-Comté in eastern France.

It is a secluded village close to Besançon and Dole. It is also close to the Swiss border.

Population

Sights
The Château de Clairvans is the major landmark in Chamblay. The château which is now a hotel was restored by Emine Karam in the 1920s.

See also
Communes of the Jura department

References

Communes of Jura (department)
Jura communes articles needing translation from French Wikipedia